Robert Dutil is a Canadian businessman and politician, who was a Quebec Liberal Party member of the National Assembly of Quebec from 1985 to 1994 and from 2008 to 2015.

Background

He was born in Saint-Georges, Quebec on April 16, 1950. He is the grandson of politician Édouard Lacroix and the brother of businessman Marcel Dutil.

Education

Dutil obtained a bachelor's degree in physical education in 1973  and a master's degree in business administration in 1982 both from Laval University.

Local politics

Dutil served in the Saint-Georges City Council as a city councillor from 1975 to 1979 and as mayor from 1979 to 1985. He was a prefect for the Beauce-Sartigan Regional County Municipality from 1982 to 1985.

Member of the provincial legislature

He ran as a Liberal candidate in the provincial district of Beauce-Sud in the 1985 election and won. He was appointed to Premier Robert Bourassa's cabinet in 1985 and was in charge of different portfolios, including communications and supply and services. He was re-elected in the 1989 election, but did not run for re-election in the 1994 election.

In 2008, Dutil founded the Union du centre political party; however, later that year he was elected as the Liberal candidate in the 2008 election in his old district of Beauce-Sud, and the Union du centre party later dissolved without ever running candidates for office.

Dutil became revenue minister on December 18, 2008, replacing Jean-Marc Fournier who did not seek a re-election. Following a 2010 cabinet shuffle, Dutil was named minister of public safety, replacing Jacques Dupuis.

He announced his resignation from the legislature in September 2015.

Business interests

Since 2002, Dutil has been vice-president of Structal-ponts, a division of Canam Manac Group. He was also in the 1970s and 1980s co-owner of several businesses mostly in the Saint-Georges area. He was also president or vice-president for several other small businesses from 1996 to 2008.

Footnotes

External links
 

1950 births
Living people
Mayors of places in Quebec
Members of the Executive Council of Quebec
People from Saint-Georges, Quebec
Quebec Liberal Party MNAs
Université Laval alumni
21st-century Canadian politicians